Stéphane Le Mignan (born 4 June 1974) is a French football coach and a former midfielder. He manages Championnat National side Concarneau.

Playing career
Le Mignan spent his entire playing career in the French lower leagues with Montagnarde, Pontivy, Locminé and Vannes.

Coaching career
He took up coaching following his retirement in 2001 and the following year, aged 28, he was appointed manager of Vannes following the departure of Denis Goavec. In 2005, Le Mignan led the team to the Championnat de France amateur Group D title and subsequent promotion to the Championnat National. Three years later, Vannes were crowned champions of the National as they finished four points ahead of Tours. Le Mignan guided the team to safety in their first season in the professional Ligue 2 in 2008–09. Vannes remained in the second tier of French football until 2011, when they were relegated back to the National. On 27 December 2012, he left Vannes where he spent almost ten years as manager.

On 14 March 2020, he was hired by Championnat National club Concarneau.

References

External links

1974 births
People from Auray
Sportspeople from Morbihan
Footballers from Brittany
Living people
French footballers
Association football midfielders
GSI Pontivy players
Saint-Colomban Sportive Locminé players
Vannes OC players
French football managers
Vannes OC managers
US Boulogne managers
French expatriate football managers
Expatriate football managers in Qatar
French expatriate sportspeople in Qatar